Corey Neilson (born August 22, 1976) is a Canadian born-British former professional ice hockey defenceman who was formerly the long-time head coach of the Nottingham Panthers of the British Elite Ice Hockey League from 2008-2018. 

In November 2022, Neilson returned to the Nottingham Panthers as head coach until the end of the 2022–23 season, replacing Gary Graham.

Neilson was drafted 53rd overall in the 1994 NHL Entry Draft by the Edmonton Oilers and spent the next few years developing his game in the major junior Ontario Hockey League before turning professional in 1997.  Neilson spent several seasons in the ECHL, getting called up to the American Hockey League before heading over to England to play for the Nottingham Panthers, where he played from 2006 when he was signed by then coach Mike Ellis as a player. He was later appointed player-coach in 2008 following a season as assistant player coach to Ellis.

Neilson continued to play and coach for the Panthers until he retired part way through the 2012–13 season, in which he later led the Nottingham Panthers to their first league title in 57 years and a grand slam season in 2012–13 (even though they only won 3 out of the 4 available trophies). Upon securing the league, the club retired Neilson's number 77 jersey alongside some of the Panthers legends of the past, Neilson became the 5th player to have his jersey retired by the club. In addition, under his leadership Panthers won six Challenge Cups and four Playoff championships, making him the most successful coach in Nottingham Panthers history.

In 2018, Neilson became the new head coach of German DEL2 side Lausitzer Füchse. He was relieved of his position in February 2021.

After a short spell coaching Norwegian side Manglerud Star Ishockey, Neilson was named the new head coach of Slovak Extraliga side HK Poprad in November 2021.

After leaving HK Poprad, Neilson was named as the new head coach of German DEL2 side EC Kassel Huskies on February 23, 2022 - replacing Tim Kehler.

In November 2022, Neilson returned to Nottingham as head coach on a deal until the end of the season.

Neilson also played for the Great Britain national ice hockey team after he obtained dual nationality. He is currently an assistant coach of the GB team - along with Adam Keefe - working under head coach Pete Russell.

Awards and honours

Career statistics

References

External links

1976 births
Living people
Barrie Colts players
British ice hockey defencemen
Canadian emigrants to England
Canadian expatriate ice hockey players in the United States
Canadian ice hockey defencemen
Detroit Whalers players
Edmonton Oilers draft picks
Elmira Jackals (UHL) players
Florida Everblades players
Great Britain men's national ice hockey team coaches
Ice hockey people from New Brunswick
Ice hockey player-coaches
Louisiana IceGators (ECHL) players
Nottingham Panthers players
North Bay Centennials players
Pensacola Ice Pilots players
Portland Pirates players
Quad City Mallards (UHL) players
Syracuse Crunch players
Canadian expatriate ice hockey players in Germany
Canadian expatriate ice hockey players in England
Naturalised citizens of the United Kingdom
Naturalised sports competitors
Canadian ice hockey coaches
British ice hockey coaches
Canadian expatriate sportspeople in Slovakia
British expatriate sportspeople in Slovakia
British expatriate sportspeople in Germany
Canadian expatriate sportspeople in Norway
British expatriate sportspeople in Norway